Argentala argoptera is a moth of the family Notodontidae first described by James S. Miller in 2008. It is found along the western slope of the Ecuadorian Andes in cloud forest habitats at elevations between 1,200 and 2,600 meters.

The length of the forewings is 15–16 mm for males. The forewings are evenly covered with a rich, chocolate-brown ground color and the hindwings are evenly covered with a dark chocolate brown, although they are white on the ventral surface, showing faintly through in the basal threequarters.

Etymology
The species name is derived from the Greek argos (meaning white) and pteron (meaning wing or feather) and refers to the ventral wing surfaces, which exhibit by far the most white of any Argentala species.

References
 

Moths described in 2008
Notodontidae of South America